The Jinkara are a Rajput clan found in the state of Gujarat in India. They are also known as Jhikara.

Origin
The Jinkara or Jhikara as petty land owner Rajput. who even work in their fields but do not allow their women-folk to work. even Jikara not allowed widow remarriage. Jinkara are said to have once  serve as warlords in the army of the Rajput chiefs. They acquired their name on account of the dependent status, as they used "jee" behind their name as respect. The word "jee" means "yes" in the Gujarati language.

See also
 Rajputs of Gujarat
 Vantia

References

Rajput clans of Gujarat